A constitutional referendum was held in the Republic of Upper Volta on 15 March 1959. Unlike almost all other French colonies in Africa (which were presidential republics), the new constitution would make the territory parliamentary republic with a unicameral National Assembly. It was approved by 80% of voters with a 68.7% turnout.

Results

References

1959
1959 referendums
1959 in Upper Volta
Constitutional referendums